Ziditshov is a Hasidic dynasty originating in town Ziditshov (as known in Yiddish; or Zhydachiv in Ukrainian), in Galicia (a province of the former Austro-Hungarian Empire). It was founded by Rebbe Tzvi Hirsh of Ziditshov. Today, the few who remain of the Ziditshov dynasty live in Brooklyn, Monticello, New York, Chicago, Baltimore, London, and Israel.

Spiritual lineage of the Ziditshov dynasty
Grand Rabbi Yisrael Baal Shem Tov - founder of Hasidism.
Grand Rebbe Dov Ber of Mezeritch - the Maggid (Preacher) of Mezritch - disciple of the Baal Shem Tov.
Grand Rebbe Elimelech of Lizhensk - author of Noam Elimelech - disciple of the Maggid of Mezritsh.
Grand Rabbi Yaakov Yitzchak of Lublin - the Chozeh (Seer) of Lublin - author of Zichron Zos - disciple of the Noam Elimelech.
Grand Rabbi Tzvi Hirsh of Ziditshov - author of Ateres Tzvi - disciple of the Chozeh of Lublin.

The family
Grand Rabbi Yitzchak Isaac Eichenstein of Safrin (1740-1800)
Grand Rabbi [[Tzvi Hirsh of Zidichov|Tzvi Hirsch of Ziditshov]] (1763-1831), author of Ateres Tzvi on the Zohar, son of Rabbi Isaac of Safrin
Rabbi Moshe Eichenstein of Sambur (d. 1840), author of "Tefilo leMoshe", son of Rabbi Isaac of Safrin
Rabbi Yissochor Berish Eichenstein of Safrin (d. 1832), son of Rabbi Yitzchak Isaac of Safrin
Rabbi Naftoli Hertzl Labin of Ziditshov, son-in-law of Rabbi Tzvi Hirsch Eichenstein of Ziditshov, the Ateres Tzvi.
Rabbi Yitzchak Isaac Eichenstein of Ziditshov (1805-1873), author of Likutei Maharya, only son of Rabbi Yissochor Berish of Safrin
Rabbi Shlomo Yaakov Eichenstein of Ziditchov (d. 1886), son of Rabbi Yitzchok
Rabbi Nochum of Burshtin
Rabbi Eliezer of Burshtin
Rabbi Yitzchok Menachem Eichenstein of Burshtin-Podheitz (1879-1943), son of Rabbi Shlomo Yaakov and son-in-law of Rabbi Nochum 
Rabbi Shlomo Yaakov Zeide Eichenstein of Burshtin (1899-1963), son of Rabbi Yitzchok
Rabbi Yitzchok Menachem Eichenshtein, Galanter Rebbe, son of Rabbi Shlomo Yaakov
Rabbi Dovid Eichenstein, Burshtiner Rebbe, son of Rabbi Shlomo Yaakov
Rabbi Israel Yosef Labin of Ziditshov (d. 1902), son of Rabbi Naftoli Hertsl of Ziditshov, and son-in-law of Rabbi Yitzchok Isaac of Ziditshov
Rabbi Moshe Labin of Ziditshov-Drubitsh (d. 1939), son of Rabbi Israel Yosef of Ziditshov
Rabbi Alexander Yom Tov Labin of Bergsas, son-in-law of Rabbi Moshe of Drubitsh
Rabbi Naftali Tzvi Labin of Ziditshov, son of Rabbi Alexander Yom Tov Labin
Rabbi Alexander (Sender) Yom Tov Lipa Labin, son of Rabbi Naftali Tzvi Labin
Rabbi Shlomo Dov Labin, Rebbe of Ziditchov-london, son of Rabbi Naftali Tzvi Labin
Rabbi Moshe Labin, Drubitsher Rebbe, son of Rabbi Naftali Tzvi Labin
Rabbi Yeshaya Labin, Zidichover Rebbe son of Rabbi Naftali Tzvi Labin
Rabbi Aharon Maier Labin, Bolchav Rebbe in Williamsburg, son of Rabbi Naftali Tzvi Labin
Rabbi Yitzchak Isaac Labin, Ziditchover Rov in Bnei Brak, son of Rabbi Naftali Tzvi Labin
Rebbetzin Hinda Kohn, daughter of Rabbi Naftali Tzvi Labin, wife of Rebbe Dovid Kohn, Toldos Aharon Rebbe in Jerusalem
Rebbetzin Esther Malka Segal-Loewy, daughter of Rabbi Naftali Tzvi Labin, wife of Rabbi Elimelech Segal-Loewy of Tosh — son of Rebbe Meshulam Feish
Rabbi Alexander (Sender) Yom Tov Lipa Eichenstein of Zidachov (1824-October 12, 1883), son of Rabbi Yitzchok Isaac of Ziditshov
Rabbi Yehoshia Heshl Eichenstein of Khodorov, son of Rabbi Alexander Yom Tov Lipa of Ziditshov
Rabbi Yisochor Berish Eichenstein of Khodorov (d. 1918), son of Rabbi Yehoshia Heshl of Khodorov
Grand Rabbi Yehoshua Heshl Eichenstein of Ziditshov-Chicago (moved from Galitzia to Chicago in 1922) (d. 1940), son of Rabbi Yisochor Berish of Khodorov
Grand Rabbi Avrohom Eichenstein of Ziditshov-Chicago (d. 1967), son of Rabbi Yehoshua
Grand Rabbi Yehoshua Heshl Eichenstein of Ziditshov-Chicago, son of Rabbi Avrohom
Rabbi Pinchos Eichenstein of Chodrov-Chicago, son of Rabbi Yehoshua Heshl (II) of Chicago.
Rabbi Yissocher Dov Eichenstein of Baltimore, son of Rabbi Yehoshua Heshl (II) of Chicago
Rabbi Yecheskal Eichenstein of Marine Park Brooklyn, son of Rabbi Yehoshua Heshl (II) of Chicago
Rabbi Zalman Leib Eichenstein of Chicago, son of Rabbi Yehoshua Heshl (II) of Chicago.
Chief Rabbi Menachem Tsvi Eichenstein, of St Louis (1943–1982), son of Rabbi Yehoshua Heshl (I) of Chicago
Rabbi Dov Ber Alter Eichenstein, son of Rabbi Menachem
Rabbi Moshe Mordechei Eichenstein of Trisk (born August 7, 1958 at Jerusalem), son of Rabbi Dov Ber Alter
Rabbi Yisochor Berish Eichenstein of Veretzky (1848-1924), author of the Malbush L'Shabbos V'Yom Tov, son of Rabbi Alexander Yom Tov Lipa of Ziditshov
Rabbi Usher Yeshaya Eichenstein of Prochnik, son of Rabbi Yisochor Berish Eichenstein of Veretzky
Rabbi Yehoshua Eichenstein Ziditshover Rebbe of Grosswardein, son of Rabbi Usher Yeshaya Eichenstein of Prochnik and son-in-law of Rabbi Chaim Yitzchok Yeruchem of  Aldstadt
Rabbi Nosson Eichenstein of Tel Aviv, son of Rabbi Yehoshua Eichenstein of Grosswardein and son in law of Rav Shmaryohu Gurari
Rabbi Yissochor Berish Eichenstein, Ziditshover Rebbe in Petach Tikvah, son of Rabbi Yehoshua Eichenstein 
Mrs. Bluma Horowitz, daughter of Rabbi Yehoshua Eichenstein, wife of Rabbi Feivel Horowitz
Mrs. Riva Rubin, daughter of Rabbi Yehoshua Eichenstein, wife of Rabbi Simcha Rubin of Tomashov
Mrs. Mirel Rubin, daughter of Rabbi Yehoshua Eichenstein, wife of Rabbi Mordche Dovid Rubin of Sasregen
Mrs. Sara Zevald, daughter of Rabbi Yehoshua Eichenstein, wife of Rabbi Moshe Zevald 
Rabbi Menashe Yitzchok Meir Eichenstein, Ziditshover Rebbe of Petah Tikva, son of Rabbi Usher Yeshaya Eichenstein of Prochnik
Rabbi Sholom Eichenstein (1901‑1987), Ziditshover Rebbe of Tzfat, son of Rabbi Usher Yeshaya Eichenstein
Rabbi Yisochor Berish Eichenstein(1924-1999), Ziditshover-Apter Rebbe, Borough Park son of Rabbi Sholom Eichenstein. Son-in-law of Grand Rabbi Levy Yitzchok Leifer the Nadvorner-Chaifa Rebbe.
Rabbi Yosef Meir Eichenstein, son of Rabbi Yisochor Berish Eichenstein 
Rabbi Chaim Eichenstein, son of Rabbi Yisochor Berish Eichenstein
Rabbi Yehosha Moshe Eichenstein, son of Rabbi Yisochor Berish Eichenstein
Rebbitzen Chana Hollander, Daughter of Rabbi Yisochor Berish Eichenstein
 Rabbi Shaul Yedidia Elezar Rosen son of Rebbitzen Chana Hollander
Rabbi Usher Yeshaya Eichenstein (1934-2008), son of Rabbi Sholom Eichenstein and son-in-law of Rabbi Moshe Aryeh Lev, Rav of Temeshvar
Rabbi Chaim Yehoshua Eichenstein, Zidichover Rebbe, son of Rabbi Usher Yeshaya Eichenstein
Rabbi Yitzchak Isaac Shneebalg, Ziditshover Rebbe of Be'er Sheva, grandson of Rabbi Sholom Eichenstein
Rabbi Yisochor Berish Eichenstein of Dolyna (d. 1886), son of Rabbi Yitzchak Isaac of Ziditshov
Rabbi Eliyohu Eichenstein of Ziditshov (1837-1878), son of Rabbi Yitzchak Isaac of Ziditshov
Rabbi Menachem Mendel Eichenstein of Ziditshov (1840-1901), son of Rabbi Yitzchak Isaac of Ziditshov

There is also Rabbi Alter Kahane of Ziditshov, who is a scion of the Spinka dynasty.

Main books of Ziditshover Hasidism
The main books of the Ziditshov dynasty are: 
Ateres Tzvi by Tzvi Hirsh of Ziditshov.
Sur Meiro Va'asei Tov by Tzvi Hirsh of Ziditshov.

Rebbes of Ziditshov 
Tzvi Hirsh of Zidichov
Yitzchak Isaac of Zidichov
Naftali Tzvi Labin of Ziditshov

References

See also
Burshtin (Hasidic dynasty)
Veretzky (Rabbinical dynasty)
Komarno (Hasidic dynasty)

Hasidic dynasties
Jewish Galician (Eastern Europe) history
Orthodox Judaism in Chicago
Orthodox Judaism in London
Orthodox Judaism in Baltimore
Hasidic Judaism in New York City
People from Zhydachiv
Ukrainian-Jewish culture in Baltimore
Ukrainian-Jewish culture in New York City

yi:זידיטשוב